Kobe is a city in Japan and capital of the Hyōgo prefecture.

Kobe or KOBE may also refer to:

People
 Kobe Bryant (1978–2020), American basketball player
 Kobe (artist) (1950–2014), Belgian visual artist and sculptor
 Kobe (esports commentator) (born 1986), American commentator for Riot Games
 Kobe (singer) ( from 2005), American singer and songwriter
 Kobe (given name), includes a list of people with the given name
 Kobe (surname), includes a list of people with the surname

Other uses
 Kobé, a department of the Wadi Fira region in Chad
 Kobe beef, traditionally raised beef from the prefecture surrounding Kobe in Japan
 Okeechobee County Airport, Florida, U.S., ICAO airport code KOBE
 KOBE (AM), a radio station in New Mexico, U.S.

See also

 Cobe (disambiguation)
 Coby (disambiguation)
 Kobi (disambiguation)
 Kobes, a surname